Chonioconarida is an extinct subclass of free living animals from the Tentaculita class, 
which were common in the Silurian and Devonian oceans. Chonioconarids have a slim and long 
needle-like larval parts. They are covered with sculpture throughout (Farsan 2005). Their affinity is unknown. Their fossils are known from Australia, Asia, Europe, Africa, North and South America.

References

 Farsan, N.M. 2005. Description of the early ontogenetic part of the Tentaculitids, with implications for classification. Lethaia 38: 255-270.

Tentaculita
Silurian animals
Devonian animals
Late Devonian animals
Silurian first appearances
Devonian extinctions